Éber Henrique Ferreira de Bessa or Éber Bessa (born 21 March 1992) is a Brazilian professional footballer who plays as a midfielder for Indonesian club Bali United.

Career
On 24 January 2015, Éber Bessa signed with Marítimo. On 5 May 2018, after over three years at the club, Bessa left Marítimo.

On 8 September 2021, he signed with Indonesian Liga 1 club Bali United. He made his debut on 18 September 2021 at Indomilk Arena, coming as a substitute, he provided an assist in a 2–2 league draw against Persib Bandung.

Honours

Club 
Bali United
 Liga 1: 2021–22

Individual 
 Liga 1 Team of the Season: 2021–22
 APPI Indonesian Football Award Best 11: 2021–22

References

External links

1992 births
Living people
Brazilian footballers
Brazilian expatriate footballers
Cruzeiro Esporte Clube players
Villa Nova Atlético Clube players
Eber Bessa
C.S. Marítimo players
Vitória F.C. players
Botafogo de Futebol e Regatas players
C.D. Nacional players
Bali United F.C. players
Primeira Liga players
Campeonato Brasileiro Série B players
Campeonato Brasileiro Série A players
Eber Bessa
Brazilian expatriate sportspeople in Thailand
Expatriate footballers in Thailand
Brazilian expatriate sportspeople in Portugal
Expatriate footballers in Portugal
Expatriate footballers in Indonesia
Brazilian expatriate sportspeople in Indonesia
Association football midfielders
Liga 1 (Indonesia) players
Footballers from Belo Horizonte